The Kewat, also spelled Kevat, is a Hindu caste, found in the states of Rajasthan, Madhya Pradesh, Chhattisgarh, Odisha, Bihar and Uttar Pradesh in India. They are the traditional boatmen of northern India.
Kewat are recognised as OBC catagory in central list.

Origin 
The name "Kevata" was first appeared in the Pillar Edict V of Emperor Ashoka. "Kevata-bhoga" referred to places or bhuktis where this community resided. The people whose livelihoods centred around water or aquatic bodies used to be called Kevat.

Divisions

Their main sub-groups are the Banaphar, Dhivar,  Balavarna, Chay, Sorahiya, Kairata, and Tiar. The Banaphar consider themselves to be superior to the other groups.

Present circumstances

In Uttar Pradesh

The Kewat of Uttar Pradesh mostly live near the river Ganges. They are the traditional businessman.  They are among 17 OBC communities that have been proposed for Scheduled Caste status by the Samajwadi Party-controlled Government of Uttar Pradesh. However, this proposal, which relates to votebank politics and has been made in the past, has been stayed by the courts; a prior attempt was also rejected by the Government of India.

In Rajasthan

The Kewat in Rajasthan are found in along the banks of the rivers Chambal, Benas and Kalinath rivers, in the districts of Kota and Sawai Madhopur. They are divided into eighty four clans, and their origin myth refers to them being created by god Vishnu. The community speak the Hadoti dialect of Rajasthani. There traditional occupation of being boatmen has declined.

In Bihar

In Bihar, they are both cultivators and businessman. The community are also known as Kewat Kaut. There is considerable difference of opinion as to the origin of the word Kewat.  They are found in almost all the districts of Bihar but mostly in  Madhubani , Jhanjharpur, Nirmalli, Bhagalpur, Purnea, Katihar, Darbhanga, Munger, Muzaffarpur and Khagaria, Saharsa, Supaul, Madhepura . Their villages are found mainly along the near of the Ganges river, and many have taken to cultivation. They speak Maithili, Magadhi and Bhojpuri.

A major population of kewat/keot/kaut live in the district of Madhubani.  The farmers of the Jhanjharpur region are more prosperous while those belonging to the kosi (the flood effected) belt not so prosperous with many of them taken to jobs outside the state. Maithili is the major language spoken in the district of Madhubani, Darbhanga, Jhajharpur etc.

References

Social groups of Uttar Pradesh
Indian castes
Hindu communities
Social groups of Rajasthan
Social groups of Bihar
Other Backward Classes